Saint Ceratus of Grenoble (also Ceras or Gerase) was a 5th-century bishop of Gratianopolis, now Grenoble. 

He is venerated as a saint by the Roman Catholic Church; his feast day is celebrated on 6 June.

Life
Ceratus was  bishop of Gratianopolis in Dauphiné, France, between about 441 and 450. During his episcopate he opposed the Arianism of the Burgundian invaders, by whom he was eventually driven into exile.

His relics were preserved in Simorre Abbey in the Archdiocese of Auch.

References

5th-century bishops in Gaul
Bishops of Grenoble
Year of birth unknown
Canonizations by Pope Pius X